Defending champion Venus Williams defeated her sister Serena Williams in the final, 6–2, 6–4 to win the women's singles tennis title at the 2001 US Open. It was her fourth major singles title, and she did not lose a set during the tournament. The championship match was the first of nine major finals contested by the sisters, and the first US Open women's singles final to take place during American television prime time.

Seeds

Qualifying

Draw

Finals

Top half

Section 1

Section 2

Section 3

Section 4

Bottom half

Section 5

Section 6

Section 7

Section 8

References

External links
2001 US Open – Women's draws and results at the International Tennis Federation

2001 US Open (tennis)
US Open (tennis) by year – Women's singles
2001 in women's tennis
2001 in American women's sports